St. Lucia Airways Limited was a privately owned company founded in 1975. General and tourist flights were operated mainly to Martinique and Barbados, but also extended throughout the Caribbean and South America. There was also a shuttle service between the two St. Lucia airports of Vigie and Hewannora. A Boeing 707 was acquired in 1982 for cargo charter work. Head office was listed as PO Box 253, Castries, St. Lucia, West Indies.

History 
During the 1986 arms for hostages scandal, U.S. Marine Corps Col. Oliver North arranged for shipments of Raytheon MIM-23 HAWK antiaircraft missiles to Israel. "The CIA's air branch suggested a proprietary which did clandestine work for the agency - St. Lucia Airways." The CIA congressional relations man, Clair George, was unavailable, so Duane Clarridge, the Latin America division chief, checked with the acting Deputy Director of Operations, Ed Juchniewicz, who told North that, in addition to its proprietary work, St. Lucia operated as a commercial venture. So it was available to anyone for special charter operations.

"North arranged for St. Lucia to provide two Boeing 707s. They were able to carry HAWK antiaircraft missiles to Israel, where the HAWKs were transferred to Israeli planes for transit to Iran. North was running the operation through a Swiss bank account, Lake Resources, Inc. (number 386-430-22-1 at Crédit Suisse). For coming up with an airline on short notice, North told [Vice Adm. John] Poindexter on their interoffice computer, 'Clarridge deserves a medal.'".

Fleet 
In 1982 the firm operated two aircraft.
Britten-Norman BN-2A Islander, manufacturers serial number 612, registration J6-LAS, formerly registered VQ-LAS
Boeing 707-323C, manufacturers serial number 18689, registration J6-SLF, formerly registered G-WIND.
Lockheed L-100-20 manufacturers serial number 382-4129, registration J6-SLO, formerly registered C-FPWN

Incidents 

Lars Olausson's "Lockheed Hercules Production List" provides the following tie-in between Oliver North's St. Lucia operation and current suspected CIA operative Tepper Aviation

27 November 1989: L-100 c.n. 4129, delivered to ZAC-Alexander, registered 9J-RBW, April 1966, sold to Maple Leaf Leasing, 1969, leased to Pacific Western Airlines, line number 383, March 1969, damaged Eureka, Nunavut, August 1969, rebuilt as L-100-20, December 1969. Leased to Alaska International Air, (earlier Interior Airways, later MarkAir), December 1969. Sold to Pacific Western Airlines, registered CF-PWN, 1977, then sold to St. Lucia Airways, registered J6-SLO, May 1985, named "Juicy Lucy", after a rock and roll band, 1969–1972, transporting cargo for UNITA, July 1987. Sold to Tepper Aviation, Florida, N9205T, January 1988, named "Grey Ghost" - crash landing at Jamba, Angola.

See also

Air America
Civil Air Transport
Rendition aircraft
Southern Air Transport
Tepper Aviation
Evergreen International Aviation
Intermountain Aviation

References

External links

Central Intelligence Agency front organizations
Companies of Saint Lucia